CD-196 or No. 196 was a Type D escort ship of the Imperial Japanese Navy during World War II.

History
She was laid down on 31 December 1944 at the Nagasaki shipyard of Mitsubishi Heavy Industries for the benefit of the Imperial Japanese Navy and launched on 26 February 1945. On 31 March 1945, she was completed and commissioned. On 23 June 1945, she arrived at Yamada Bay where she underwent repair. On 15 August 1945, Japan announced their unconditional surrender and she was surrendered to Allied forces. On 30 November 1945, she was struck from the Navy List.

On 1 December 1945, she was assigned to the Allied Repatriation Service and completed a number of repatriation trips before being ceded to Soviet Union as a war reparation on 28 August 1947. She served as patrol boat EK-33 (ЭК-33) in the Soviet Pacific Ocean Fleet. In 1954, she was re-designated as a dispatch ship and renamed Turgay (Тургай). On 11 March 1958, she was decommissioned and scrapped soon after.

References

Bibliography

1945 ships
Type D escort ships
Ships built by Mitsubishi Heavy Industries
Ships of the Soviet Navy